Miyakea sinevi is a moth in the family Crambidae. It was described by Schouten in 1992. It is found in Mongolia.

References

Crambini
Moths described in 1992
Moths of Asia